Ali Messaoud (born 13 April 1991) is a professional footballer who plays as an attacking midfielder. Born in the Metherlands, he represented Morocco at under-23 international level.

Career
On 20 July 2019, Danish 1st Division club Vendsyssel FF announced that they had signed Messaoud on a two-year contract. Vendsyssel confirmed on 15 January 2021, that Messaoud had returned to the Netherlands to join Roda JC Kerkrade.

International career
Born in the Netherlands to Moroccan parents, Messaoud debuted for the Morocco national under-23 football team in a friendly 1–2 loss to the Ivory Coast U23s on 17 November 2010.

Career statistics

Honours
Willem II
Eerste Divisie: 2013–14

Vaduz
Liechtenstein Football Cup: 2015–16, 2016–17

References

External links
 Voetbal International profile 

1991 births
Living people
Moroccan footballers
Olympic footballers of Morocco
Dutch footballers
Association football midfielders
Eredivisie players
Eerste Divisie players
Swiss Super League players
Willem II (football club) players
AZ Alkmaar players
NEC Nijmegen players
Excelsior Rotterdam players
FC Vaduz players
Vendsyssel FF players
Roda JC Kerkrade players
Moroccan expatriate footballers
Dutch expatriate footballers
Expatriate footballers in Liechtenstein
Expatriate men's footballers in Denmark
Footballers from Amsterdam
Dutch sportspeople of Moroccan descent
Dutch expatriate sportspeople in Denmark
Danish 1st Division players
Dutch expatriate sportspeople in Liechtenstein
Moroccan expatriate sportspeople in Liechtenstein